Andreas Bronst (born 12 November 1957 in Rochlitz) is a German former gymnast who competed in the 1980 Summer Olympics.

References

1957 births
Living people
People from Rochlitz
German male artistic gymnasts
Olympic gymnasts of East Germany
Gymnasts at the 1980 Summer Olympics
Olympic silver medalists for East Germany
Olympic medalists in gymnastics
Sportspeople from Saxony
Medalists at the 1980 Summer Olympics